George Edward Bethune (born March 30, 1967) is a former American professional football player who was a defensive end and linebacker in the National Football League (NFL), the World League of American Football (WLAF), and the Canadian Football League (CFL). He played for the Los Angeles Rams of the NFL, the 
Sacramento Surge of the WLAF, and the Sacramento Gold Miners and San Antonio Texans of the CFL. He played collegiately at the University of Alabama, where he became a member of Phi Beta Sigma fraternity in 1987.

Professional career

Los Angeles Rams
Bethune was selected by the Los Angeles Rams in the seventh round (188th overall) of the 1989 NFL Draft. In two season with the Rams, he played in 32 games and had two sacks in each season. He wore jersey number 57. 

Bethune was released on August 19, 1991.

Sacramento Surge
Bethune was selected by the Sacramento Surge in the first round (first overall) of the 1992 World League of American Football Draft.

Houston Oilers
Bethune was signed by the Houston Oilers on July 7, 1992. He was released on August 31.

Green Bay Packers
Bethune was signed by the Green Bay Packers on February 24, 1993.

Sacramento Gold Miners
Bethune was acquired by the Sacramento Gold Miners from the Winnipeg Blue Bombers in a trade for defensive end Emanuel King on May 24, 1994.

References

1967 births
Living people
Alabama Crimson Tide football players
American football defensive ends
American football outside linebackers
American players of Canadian football
Canadian football defensive linemen
Los Angeles Rams players
People from Fort Walton Beach, Florida
Players of American football from Florida
Sacramento Gold Miners players
Sacramento Surge players
San Antonio Texans players
Choctawhatchee High School alumni